Naya Azadpur railway station is a small railway station in Naya Azadpur which is a residential and commercial neighborhood of the North West Delhi district of Delhi. Its code is NDAZ. The station is part of Delhi Suburban Railway. The station consist of four platforms, none well sheltered. It lacks many facilities including water and sanitation.

See also

 Hazrat Nizamuddin railway station
 New Delhi railway station
 Delhi Junction railway station
 Anand Vihar Terminal railway station
 Delhi Sarai Rohilla railway station
 Delhi Metro

References 

Railway stations in North West Delhi district
Delhi railway division